The Samsung Galaxy Z Flip 3 (stylized as Samsung Galaxy Z Flip3, sold as Samsung Galaxy Flip 3 in certain territories) is a foldable smartphone that is part of the Samsung Galaxy Z series. It was revealed by Samsung Electronics on August 11, 2021 at the Samsung Unpacked event alongside the Z Fold 3. It is the successor to the Samsung Galaxy Z Flip, although it is branded as the Flip 3 to align with the branding of the accompanying Fold model.

Specifications

Design 

The Z Flip 3 uses the same clamshell design as the first Z Flip with an aluminum frame, it has 6.7-in display protected by ultra-thin glass made by Samsung that can be folded into a space of 4.2-in. Once it is folded, the Samsung logo shows up by the center of the hinge. This logo design and placement is identical to its previous model Samsung Galaxy Z Flip. It also adopts 1.9 inch cover screen, which is a most notable change from 1.1 inches in the previous model. This change in cover screen enables users to download widgets such as music, weather, alarm, timer, voice recorder, today's schedule, Samsung Health, and bluetooth.

The Samsung Galaxy Z Flip 3 is available in four colors: Cream, Phantom Black, Green, and Lavender. 

There are also colors exclusive to the Bespoke Edition: Grey, White, Pink, Blue, and Yellow. This edition is a collaboration with Samsung's Bespoke refrigerator that enables customers to freely customize the colors of the fridge doors. Following the same concept, Samsung Galaxy Z Flip 3 Bespoke Edition also provides color customizing services. Customers get to mix and match the five colors for top and bottom part of the phone. Unlike the official edition, which the color of hinge changes based on the color of the phone, the color of hinge from the Bespoke edition is limited to silver and black.

Hardware 
The Z Flip 3 features a 6.7-in 22:9 AMOLED display now with support for 120 Hz refresh rate and also features support for HDR10+. The screen features a hole punch camera cutout for the front facing camera. The back of the phone has a small 1.9-in cover screen, an improvement in size over the 1.1-in cover screen on the original Z Flip, which you can use to display the time, date and battery status, interact with notifications, answer phone calls and act as a viewfinder. The phone is powered by the Qualcomm Snapdragon 888, with 8 GB of LPDDR5 RAM and 128 or 256 GB options of non-expandable UFS 3.1 storage. The Z Flip 3 features the same 3300 mAh dual battery that can fast charge using USB-C at up to 15 W or wirelessly via Qi at up to 10 W. The power button is embedded in the frame and doubles as the fingerprint sensor as well as a method to bring down the notification panel and launch Samsung Pay, with the volume rocker located above. The phone features three cameras, with dual rear cameras, a 12MP Wide-angle Camera and a 12MP Ultra Wide Camera to go along with a 10MP Front Camera. The Z Flip 3 introduces an IPX8 water resistant rating, which Samsung claims can survive being submerged 5 feet of water for up to 30 minutes.

Critical reception 
Samsung Galaxy Z Flip3 earned 83/100 from the tech reviewing site Techspot Metascore. Techspot also published 9.2/10.0 for the product's user score. According to Techspot, reviewers gave positive comments on pricing of the phone, water resistance, 1.9 inch cover screen with widgets, and high quality main screen. They also left positive reviews on the design and color of the product. On the other hand, reviewers left negative comments on the quality of the camera, thickness of the phone when folded, and relatively small battery. They also questioned long-term screen durability and potential 'crease' issues. Crease issue concerned many of the users because it was the biggest downside of a flip phone. According to Segan from PCMag, having a foldable phone is very innovative, but seeing crease is not appealing. The tech website Expertreviews commented that the foldable phone market finally got a foldable phone that is worth buying. They gave 5/5 score to the device.

Negative viewpoints criticizes that they do not find the need of getting a foldable phone. Alex Perry of Mashable says that Samsung Galaxy Z Flip3 may be the best foldable phone in the market, but, regardless of its quality, "cannot for the life of me imagine buying one."

References

External links 
 

Mobile phones introduced in 2021
Android (operating system) devices
Mobile phones with multiple rear cameras
Foldable smartphones
Mobile phones with 4K video recording
Dual screen phone
Samsung Galaxy
Flip phones
Discontinued flagship smartphones
Samsung smartphones